Rudolf Westphal (3 July 182610 July 1892) was a German classical scholar.

Life
Westphal was born at Obernkirchen in Schaumburg.
He studied at Marburg and Tübingen, and was professor at Breslau (1858–1862) and Moscow (1875–1879). He subsequently lived at Bückeburg, and died at Stadthagen in Schaumburg-Lippe on 10 July 1892. Westphal devoted his life in translating and interpreting the works of Aristoxenus. He then applied Greek theories of poetic meter to eighteenth- and nineteenth century music.

Westphal was a man of varied attainments, but his chief claim to remembrance rests upon his contributions on Greek music and metre.
His chief works were:
Griechische Metrik (3rd ed., 1885–1889)
System der antiken Rhythmik (1865)
Hephaestion's De metris enchiridion (1866)
Aristoxenus of Tarentum (translation and commentary, 1883–1893, vol. ii. being edited after his death by F Saran)
Die Musik des griechischen Altertums (1883)
Allgemeine Metrik der indogermanischen and semitischen Volker (1892)
He made translations of Catullus (1870) and of Aristophanes' Acharnians (1889), in which he successfully reproduced the Dorisms in Low German.

References

1826 births
1892 deaths
People from Schaumburg
German classical scholars
German music theorists
19th-century German musicologists